The CAL FIRE Aviation Management Program is a branch of the California Department of Forestry and Fire Protection (known also as CAL FIRE). Due to the frequency and severity of wildfires in California, the state has elected to establish its own aerial firefighting force rather than rely solely on national resources. The Aviation Management Program is based at McClellan Airfield near Sacramento, California.

Overview
In support of its ground forces, the California Department of Forestry and Fire Protection (CAL FIRE) emergency response air program includes 23 Grumman S-2T 1,200 gallon airtankers, 12 UH-1H Super Huey helicopters, and 16 OV-10A airtactical aircraft. It is in the process of adding 7 C-130H 4,000 gallon airtankers. These aircraft are stationed at 14 airtanker and 11 (10 CAL FIRE, 1 joint CAL FIRE/San Diego County Sheriff) helitack bases located statewide, and can reach most fires within 20 minutes. During high fire activity, CAL FIRE may move aircraft to better provide statewide air support.

The airtactical planes fly overhead at a fire, directing the airtankers and helicopters to critical areas of the fire for retardant and water drops. The retardant used to slow or retard the spread of a fire is a slurry mix consisting of a chemical salt compound, water, clay or a gum-thickening agent, and a coloring agent. While both air tankers and helicopters are equipped to carry fire retardant or water, the helicopters can also transport firefighters, equipment and injured personnel.

The average annual budget of the CAL FIRE Aviation Management Program is nearly $20 million. A total of 18 CAL FIRE personnel oversee the program with an additional 130 contract employees providing mechanical, pilot and management services.

CAL FIRE's current support contractors are DynCorp and Logistics Specialties Incorporated (LSI). DynCorp provides airtanker and airtactical aircraft pilot services, and all aircraft maintenance services. All CAL FIRE helicopters are flown by CAL FIRE pilots. LSI provides procurement and parts management services.

History

Air Tankers
The possibility of using aircraft for fighting wildland fires in California was first proposed in 1931 and again in the late 1940s after World War II. In 1953, the Nolta brothers of Willows, California proposed using their agriculture spray planes for fighting brush and grass fires. During the four fire seasons from 1954 to 1957, CAL FIRE used several small airtankers on a call-when-needed basis. These were primarily spray airplanes converted for use as firefighters. Also during this period, several enterprising aviation companies had been converting World War II Grumman TBM Avengers for air tanker use. Thus, in 1958 CAL FIRE first contracted for air tanker services with private aviation companies. That year contracts were let for three Naval Aircraft Factory N3N Canary, four Stearman and four TBM Avenger air tankers. The N3Ns and Stearmans were World War II biplanes used for pilot training and converted for use as agricultural spray planes. They were capable of carrying up to 200 gallons of fire retardant chemicals. The TBM, a World War II torpedo bomber, could deliver 600 gallons.

During the ensuing years other aircraft were converted to air tankers and used by CAL FIRE. Among these were Beechcraft 18 (Twin Beech), Boeing B-17 Flying Fortress, Consolidated PBY Catalina, and Grumman F7F Tigercat. The air tanker program continued to expand until finally in the early 1970s, a total of 14 TBMs, five F7Fs, one PBY and one B-17 comprised the CAL FIRE fleet.

By 1970, concerns with maintainability and accidents occurring in the TBM fleet led to an evaluation of the Grumman S-2 Tracker as a new generation air tanker. Although they were still active in the Navy, four were loaned to CAL FIRE for the evaluation. The Army Aviation Test Facility at Edwards Air Force Base completed a test program that showed the S-2 was a suitable replacement for the TBM. Two S-2 prototype air tankers were placed in service in 1973 with the prototype tank being built at the CAL FIRE Mobile Equipment Facility in Davis and the S-2 modification being completed by Hemet Valley Flying Service. These conversions were accomplished using plans developed by Ontario Lands and Forests in Ontario, Canada. 

Three TBM accidents in 1973 and three F7F accidents in 1974 accelerated the CAL FIRE S-2 modification program. As a result, contracts were entered into with four California contractors, Aero Union Corp., Sis-Q Flying Service, TBM Inc. and Hemet Valley Flying Service to modify and tank ten S-2 air tankers during the 1973/1974 winter period. As a result, 12 S-2As were placed in service in 1974 and five more were built by Bay Aviation Services and put into the fleet for the 1975 fire season.

Three separate leases with the U.S. Navy brought a total of 55 S-2s and 60 engines for the program. This allowed CAL FIRE to keep the fleet going until the mid-1990s when it was decided to upgrade from S-2A to S-2T air tankers. In 1987, CAL FIRE entered into an agreement with Marsh Aviation of Mesa, Arizona to build a prototype S-2T. This prototype was placed in service and used at several bases. The success of the prototype led to acquisition of 26 S-2E/G aircraft in 1996. The E/G series S-2 was larger and newer. A contract for building 23 of the new S-2T airtankers was entered into, with 13 delivered by the end of 2002, seven additional aircraft delivered and placed in service by the end of 2004 and the final three in 2005. As the new air tankers were delivered and placed in service, the original S-2As were retired.

In 2007, CAL FIRE contracted with 10 Tanker Air Carrier for a three year exclusive use contract utilizing a wide body McDonnell Douglas DC-10-10 aerial firefighting jet air tanker known as Tanker 910, at a cost of $5 million per year.

In 2019, CAL FIRE added 7 C-130H airtankers to the fleet, which will only become fully operation in 2023 because of the extensive modifications required to convert them to air tankers.

Air Tactical Aircraft

In the mid-1970s, CAL FIRE found that the contractor-owned air tactical planes, mostly single-engine Cessna 182s and Cessna 210s, did not provide the airspeed and safety needed for the new air tanker program. In 1974, CAL FIRE acquired 20 retired USAF Cessna O-2 observation aircraft from Davis-Monthan Air Force Base. These O-2s had been forward air control aircraft in Vietnam, had been shipped back to the United States in containers and were disassembled and on pallets when they arrived at CAL FIRE's Fresno maintenance facility. A crew of California Conservation Corp (CCC) members reassembled the aircraft. They were placed in service in 1976. The O-2 program was a success and served the Department for more than 20 years.

In 1993, CAL FIRE obtained 16 twin-engine turbine-powered North American OV-10A aircraft from the U.S. Navy. The OV-10s replaced the O-2s as the CAL FIRE's next-generation air tactical platform.

Helicopter Program

In 1960 the Division of Forestry decided to experiment with a small, skilled initial attack, or "helitack" crew to be transported by helicopter to increase the early arrival of manpower and equipment to an initial attack fire. Although the crews were trained for hover jumping and had purchased heli-jump suits from the US Forest Service, it was never found necessary to make a jump. Six helitack bases were established in the early 1970s. They were staffed with contracted Bell JetRangers. A typical CAL FIRE helitack crew which responded with the helicopter consisted of one fire captain and two to three seasonal firefighters.

CAL FIRE began using contractor-owned helicopters for fire control in the mid-1960s. Bell 47, Hiller FH1100, Bell 206 JetRangers and Aerospatiale Alouettes were used the most through the 1970s. The helicopters were located at CAL FIRE facilities which protected high value timberlands and critical watershed areas generally in Northern and Central California with one located at Ryan Field in Southern California. The helicopter began playing an increasing role in the CAL FIRE's Initial Attack strategy during the late 70s. In 1978 three Bell 205 medium helicopters were hired in addition to the standby helicopters. One helicopter was located at the Howard Forest, Mendocino Ranger Unit Headquarters. The other two were located at Hemet/Ryan Field and the Monte Vista, San Diego Ranger Unit Headquarters. Each of the medium helicopters was assigned 11 person helitack crews. Unfortunately, in the mid to late 1970s CAL FIRE experienced an increased accident rate throughout the helicopter program. Five accidents involving contractor-owned Bell Jet Rangers occurred in 1979.

As a result of the accidents, CAL FIRE decided that better approach would be for the agency to own and operate its own helicopters. In 1981, CAL FIRE leased 12 excess UH-1F Hueys which had previously been used by the USAF in Vietnam. Nine helicopters were initially reconditioned, and were operated as non-certificated, public-use aircraft. The first helicopter was built up November, 1981 and was placed in service at Hemet-Ryan Helitack Base. Six more F Model Hueys were built up and placed in service at helitack bases throughout California in the summer of 1982. During the first two years CAL FIRE employed “Personal Service Contract” pilots. Each base was assigned a full-time pilot and a seasonal relief pilot who covered two bases. The majority of the contract pilots became state employees in 1984. The helitack unit was designed to be a cohesive unit which consisted of the helicopter and helitack crew. A typical configuration for the helicopter was a Helitack Fire Captain in the copilot's seat and a Helitack Fire Captain plus six fire-fighters in the passenger compartment. The water bucket was replaced in 1984 with a newly designed Canadian  Bambi bucket. In the mid-1980s, fixed water dropping tanks were installed on several helicopters. Water bucket operations over ever-increasing populated regions in the urban interface areas of eastern Riverside County had been causing a concern. An accidental drop of a water bucket could cause catastrophic results, while a fixed tank reduced the exposure. In addition, some areas where the helicopters operated had few water sources from which a helicopter could fill its bucket. A fixed tank allowed the helicopter to obtain water from sources previously unobtainable with the bucket.

As the 1991 lease agreement expiration date with the US Air Force rapidly approached, CAL FIRE started a search for a replacement that ultimately resulted in the acquisition in 1989 of the UH-1H. The airframes that CAL FIRE obtained were part of 100 that had been released by the US Department of Defense to the US Forest Service for distribution to states as Federal Excess Personal Property (FEPP) for wildland fire fighting.

The UH-1H aircraft were significantly modified to meet CAL FIRE's specialized needs. The modified helicopters were designated as Super Hueys. The Super Huey included a larger, more powerful engine, transmission and rotor system. The tail boom and tail rotor were also modified to accommodate the engine, giving the aircraft greater performance than the standard US Army UH-1H helicopters in hotter and higher conditions typical of California.

Both the F model and the Super Huey maintenance programs were developed by CAL FIRE using the most restrictive overhaul/replacement criteria of the military or Bell Helicopter. All maintenance is performed by contract mechanics. Big Valley built up and maintained the F model helicopters from 1981 to 1990 at their Stockton facility. They also started building up the first Super Hueys in 1989. San Joaquin Helicopters completed the Super Huey build-ups and maintained them in their facility in Yolo County and later at the Aviation Management facility at Mather Field in Sacramento from 1989 to 1999. DynCorp was awarded the contract in 2000 and continued to maintain the Super Hueys at Mather and later at McClellan Airfield in North Highlands, California.

In 2019, CAL FIRE began replacing the Super Hueys with 12 new Sikorsky S-70i Firehawk from United Rotorcraft. It is planned that the Super Hueys will be retired on a 1:1 basis as S-70i fleet becomes operational.

Accidents
CDF/Cal Fire S2 Fatal Airtanker Accidents, 1973–2012
June 29, 1976 N414DF T-94 William W. Sears: Possible pilot incapacitation/heart attack. 
August 20, 1978 N448DF T-95 James M. Lippitt: Suspected stall on final approach for drop.
June 13, 1979 N404DF T-80 Gayle E. Eaton: Stall/spin during base-to-final turn (following leadplane) for drop.
July 27, 1982 N416DF T-96 James P. Eakin: Aircraft struck tree on final approach to fire, losing some flight controls before crashing.
July 13, 1984 N451DF T-92 Ted Bell Jr.: En route to fire, flew up a canyon he could not clear. Energy management.
September 28, 1984 N436DF T-100 Ed Real: Stalled turning into raising terrain after drop. Energy management.
June 29, 1986 N415DF T-77 Richard Boyd, Clarence R. Lind: Training flight; stalled after water drop. Suspect simulated engine failure practice being given..
October 7, 1987 N444DF T-79 Don Johnson: Stalled making a climbing turn after drop.                                                    
October 5, 1998 N416DF T-96 Gary Nagel: Left wing tip impacted ground during tight turn to final on high wind, quartering tailwind drop.
August 27, 2001 N450DF/T-87 Larry Groff, N442DF/T-92 Lars Stratte: Midair collision over bus accident.

References

This article contains material that originally came from a State of California website. According to their site usage guidelines, "In general, information presented on this web site, unless otherwise indicated, is considered in the public domain. It may be distributed or copied as permitted by law". For more information, please review the site's use guidelines.

External links
CDF air program website
CDF Aviation Management Procedures Handbook

Aerial firefighting
Government of California
1958 establishments in California
Government agencies established in 1958
Firefighting in California